Hanna Emilia Grobler (née Mikkonen, born 15 January 1981 in Ruovesi) is a Finnish high jumper.

She competed at the World Championships in 2005 and in 2009 without reaching the final.

She has won nine gold medals in Finnish National Championships, which is the most of all high jumpers in Finland.

Her personal best vault is 1.92 metres (national record until 2016), achieved in June 2005 in Tampere.

Achievements

References 
 

1981 births
Living people
Finnish female high jumpers
20th-century Finnish women
21st-century Finnish women